Martín Pérez de Ayala (11 November 1504 – 5 August 1566) was a Roman Catholic prelate who served as Archbishop of Valencia (1564–1566), Bishop of Segovia (1560–1564), and Bishop of Guadix (1548–1560).

Biography
Martín Pérez de Ayala was born in Segura de la Sierra, Spain on 11 November 1504.
On 16 May 1548, he was appointed during the papacy of Pope Paul III as Bishop of Guadix.
On 30 September 1548, he was consecrated bishop by Giovanni Angelo Arcimboldi, Bishop of Novara, with Giovanni Simonetta, Bishop of Lodi, and Francisco de Urríes, Bishop of Urgell, serving as co-consecrators. 
On  30 May 1549, he was installed as Bishop of Guadix. 
On 17 July 1560, he was appointed during the papacy of Pope Pius IV as Bishop of Segovia and installed on 12 July 1561.
On 6 September 1564, he was appointed during the papacy of Pope Pius IV as Archbishop of Valencia and installed on 23 Apr 1565.
He served as Archbishop of Valencia until his death on 5 August 1566.

While bishop, he was the principal co-consecrator of Diego de Covarrubias y Leiva, Archbishop of Santo Domingo (1560).

References

External links and additional sources
 (for Chronology of Bishops) 
 (for Chronology of Bishops) 
 (for Chronology of Bishops) 
 (for Chronology of Bishops) 
 (for Chronology of Bishops) 
 (for Chronology of Bishops) 

16th-century Roman Catholic bishops in Spain
Bishops appointed by Pope Julius III
Bishops appointed by Pope Pius IV
1504 births
1565 deaths
16th-century Spanish Roman Catholic theologians